The Atlanta Ripper was an unidentified serial killer who is suspected of killing at least fifteen Atlanta women between 1909 and 1914.

Background
On May 28, 1911, the body of Belle Walker, a cook, was found 25 yards from her home on Garibaldi Street in Atlanta by her sister after she failed to return home from work the previous night. Her throat had been cut by an unknown person, and the crime was reported in the Atlanta Constitution under the headline "Negro Woman Killed; No Clue to Slayer." 

As news of the murders continued to spread, the black population of Atlanta were filled with terror. On July 3, after the eighth consecutive killing, The Baltimore Sun reported that news of the murders caused few black women to be on the streets at night and black service workers were refusing to go to work after dark. 

News reports also noted the similarities of the victims in the case. By the end of 1911, fifteen women, all black or dark-skinned, all in their early 20s, had been murdered in the same manner. The victims were all described as "good looking" and "neatly dressed", with many of them having received an education. The murders were all described as having been committed with a knife or other sharp object, with their gruesomeness being of particular note. The murderer would rip, tear and mutilate the bodies of the victims after death. One victim, Lena Sharpe, was described as having had her head almost severed.

Search for suspects
The search for the serial killer, named "the Atlanta Ripper" by the press, found six different suspects but no convictions were ever made, nor was the crime ever solved. The "Ripper" may have had as many as 21 victims, but there is no conclusive proof that the murders were carried out by one person. 

It was reported that the daughter of one of the victims, who was also attacked by an assailant and recovered, caught sight of the attacker. She described him as a large, black man who was powerfully built and neatly dressed.

See also 
 List of serial killers in the United States
 List of fugitives from justice who disappeared

References 

1911 deaths
1911 in Georgia (U.S. state)
1911 murders in the United States
American serial killers
People murdered in Georgia (U.S. state)
Unidentified American serial killers
Unsolved murders in the United States